Gábor Híres (born 26 February 1958) is a former Hungarian professional footballer who played as a defender. He was a member of the Hungarian national football team. Híres has worked as an active football coach since 1994.

Career 
In 1966 he started playing football for Vasas SC. He made his first team debut in 1977. Vasas won two championship bronze medals and two Hungarian Cup victories. Until 1986, he scored 14 goals in 200 league games for the Angyalföld team Vasas SC. His next team was MTK Budapest FC, where he became a one-time champion.

National team 
He played 4 times for the national team in 1987.

Honours 

 Nemzeti Bajnokság I (NB I)
 Champion: 1986-87
 Magyar Kupa (MNK)
 Winner: 1981, 1986

References 

Living people
1958 births
Vasas SC players
MTK Budapest FC players
Hungary international footballers
Hungarian footballers
Rákospalotai EAC managers
Association football defenders
Nemzeti Bajnokság I players
People from Budapest